Bob Creek Wildland Provincial Park is a wildland provincial park located in the Municipal District of Ranchland, in southern Alberta, Canada. Much of the eastern and southern borders of the park is shared with Black Creek Heritage Rangeland. The park is included in the South Saskatchewan Region Land Use Framework. Because they are so intertwined, Bob Creek Wildland and Black Creek Heritage Rangeland are managed through the same Management Plan.

Ecology
The park is located on east of the Rocky Mountains on the eastern slopes of the Livingstone Range and contains "The Whaleback" ridge: "The Whaleback[...] encompasses the most extensive, least disturbed and relatively unfragmented Montane landscape in Alberta’s Rocky Mountain natural region."

The park contains the Alpine, Sub-Alpine and Montane subregions of the Rocky Mountain Natural Region. Together, Bob Creek Wildland and Black Creek Heritage Rangeland preserves the largest tract of montane ecosystems in Alberta. The parks are unique in Alberta as the warm Chinook winds clear the snow cover and produce one of Alberta's most important elk wintering ranges. Carnivores in the park include grizzly bears, cougars, and wolves. The geography of the park is rolling fescue grasslands with steep ridges transitioning from grass to forests and many springs and streams along the valley bottoms. The Whaleback Ridge is the last remaining area of montane wilderness in Alberta.

Activities
Backcountry hiking and camping are permitted in the park. In addition, hunting and fishing are allowed when properly licensed. The park has extensive trails for horse trail riding and off-highway vehicles, defined as snowmobiles and quads. Normally, the use of off-highway and highway vehicles are not permitted in Heritage Rangeland like Black Creek; however, legislation was created to allow vehicle use on two trails in Black Creek to access Bob Creek. The use of off-highway vehicles is controversial.

See also
List of provincial parks in Alberta
List of Canadian provincial parks
Ecology of the Rocky Mountains

References

External links
 

Parks in Alberta
Mountain ranges of Alberta